Shaghun may refer to:
 Shaghun, Khafr
 Shaghun, Simakan